William Potter Thompson (1899 – October 1959) was an English footballer who played for Nottingham Forest.

Thompson was a full back and made his debut for Nottingham Forest on 26 August 1922 in the First Division match at the City Ground against Sunderland. His last appearance was on 6 April 1935 at home in a 2–2 draw against Manchester United. He captained Forest in the 1920s.

Thompson scored five goals for Nottingham Forest, all of which were penalties.

Thompson also toured South Africa and Netherlands with FA teams.

Career Statistics

References

English footballers
Nottingham Forest F.C. players
Association football fullbacks
1899 births
Date of birth missing
Year of death missing
Place of death missing
Footballers from Derby